The 1956–57 Michigan State Spartans men's basketball team represented Michigan State University in the 1956–57 NCAA Division I men's basketball season. The team played their home games at Jenison Field House in East Lansing, Michigan and were members of the Big Ten Conference. They were coached by Forrest "Forddy" Anderson in his third year at Michigan State. The Spartans finished the season with a record of 16–10, 10–4 to win a share of the Big Ten Championship. They received the conference's bid to the NCAA tournament where they beat Notre Dame and Kentucky to advance to the Final Four. There they lost to eventual champion North Carolina. They lost to San Francisco in the third-place game.

Previous season
The Spartans finished the 1955–56 season with an overall record of 13–9, 7–7 to finish in fifth place in Big Ten play.

Season summary 
Johnny Green led MSU in rebounding at 14.6 a game and Jack Quiggle led in scoring at 15.3 points per game. Green and Quiggle were both named first team All-Big Ten.

After starting the season 4–3, Green joined the Spartans after he was discharged from the Marines. In his first four games with the Spartans, MSU lost all four games. However, the Spartans won their next 10 games before a loss in the regular-season finale to Michigan. The loss cost the Spartans an out-right championship, but they still earned their first trip to the NCAA tournament as the Big Ten representative to the NCAA Mideast Region.

In the NCAA Mideast Regional on Kentucky's campus, the No. 11-ranked Spartans played two games at 10,000-seat Memorial Coliseum: MSU avenged an earlier loss to No. 17 Notre Dame in the semifinal winning 85–83. In the final, the Spartans upset No. 3 Kentucky 80–68 to earn the school's first trip to the Final Four.

In the national semifinal, the Spartans faced No. 1 North Carolina. In a game that would be referred to as one of the greatest games in college basketball history, the lead changed 31 times. Quiggle made a half-court shot after regulation expired that would have won the game for the Spartans, but was ruled too late. Green missed a free throw at the end of the first overtime that also would have sealed the win for the Spartans. North Carolina's Pete Brennan made a basket as time expired to force a second overtime. Lennie Rosenbluth took over the Tar Heels in the third overtime as they eliminated the Spartans from championship contention.

MSU lost to San Francisco in the third-place game the following day.

Roster and statistics 

Source

Schedule and results

|-
!colspan=9 style=|Regular season

|-

|-
!colspan=9 style=|NCAA Tournament

Rankings

Source

References

Michigan State Spartans men's basketball seasons
Michigan State
NCAA Division I men's basketball tournament Final Four seasons
Michigan State Spartans basketball
Michigan State Spartans basketball